Minuscule 458 (in the Gregory-Aland numbering), α 160 (in the Soden numbering), is a Greek minuscule manuscript of the New Testament, on parchment. Palaeographically it has been assigned to the 11th century. 
Formerly it was labeled by 88a and 98p.

Description 

The codex contains the text of the Acts of the Apostles, Catholic epistles, and Pauline epistles on 276 parchment leaves with only one lacunae at the end of Titus. The text is written in one column per page, in 24 lines per page.

The order of books: Acts, Catholic epistles, and Pauline epistles.

Text 

The Greek text of the codex is a representative of the Byzantine text-type. Aland placed it in Category V.

History 

The manuscript was examined and slightly collated by Birch and Scholz. Antonio Maria Biscioni published its facsimile in 1752. C. R. Gregory saw it in 1886.

Formerly it was labeled by 88a and 98p. In 1908 Gregory gave the number 458 to it.

It is currently housed at the Laurentian Library (Plutei IV. 31) in Florence.

See also 

 List of New Testament minuscules
 Biblical manuscript
 Textual criticism

References

Further reading 

 Antonio Maria Biscioni, Bibliothecae Mediceo-Laurentianae catalogus, Florence 1752, vol. 2, p. 72-73.

External links 
 

Greek New Testament minuscules
11th-century biblical manuscripts